Sanja Đorđević (born 1969) is a Serbian turbo-folk singer best known for her hit-songs "Crveni lak" (2005); "Mutivoda" (1999) and "Svetlo crveno" (2008).

Born in 1969 in Pljevlja, she was brought up in Sarajevo. Her first album, Ko je ta, was released in 1987 by Diskoton label, while her breakthrough came in 2003. She took a four-year break between 2008 and 2013, which made her lose popularity. She is married to a former footballer,Petar, with whom she has a daughter.

See also
Music of Montenegro
turbo-folk

References

External links

21st-century Montenegrin women singers
People from Pljevlja
1969 births
Living people
Grand Production artists
20th-century Montenegrin women singers